The 2005 Canadian Grand Prix (officially the Formula 1 Grand Prix du Canada 2005) was a Formula One motor race held on 12 June 2005 at the Circuit Gilles Villeneuve in Montreal, Quebec, Canada. The 70-lap race was the eighth round of the 2005 Formula One season, the 43rd running of the Canadian Grand Prix, and the 37th running as a round of the World Championship. It set a ratings record and was the most watched F1 race in history. It was also the first of two consecutive North American rounds. The race was won by McLaren driver Kimi Räikkönen, taking his third win from four races. The two Ferrari cars completed the podium, with Michael Schumacher in second place and Rubens Barrichello in third. Both Renaults failed to finish the race, but the team maintained their lead in the Constructors' Championship; their driver, Fernando Alonso also kept his lead in the Drivers' Championship, despite the gap between himself and nearest rival Räikkönen closing by ten points.

Report

Friday drivers 
The bottom 6 teams in the 2004 Constructors' Championship were entitled to run a third car in free practice on Friday. These drivers drove on Friday but did not compete in qualifying or the race.

Jordan was banned from running a third car at this race because Franck Montagny had used six sets of tyres instead of four at the previous race.

Practice and qualifying
Christian Klien returned for the first of four confirmed races in the Red Bull Racing car, with American Scott Speed filling in the Friday testing role.

After retiring on the last lap of the European Grand Prix, Kimi Räikkönen was the 11th driver on the track in qualifying, and he managed to line up 7th on the grid. Ferrari's Rubens Barrichello suffered a gearbox failure before the start of his qualifying lap, and was forced to abort his run. Jenson Button managed to take pole position, with Michael Schumacher second, and both Renault drivers on the second row.

Race

Barrichello, who would have been last on the grid, decided to start the race from pitlane, putting extra fuel in his car. At race start, both Button and Schumacher got away slowly, and Giancarlo Fisichella and Fernando Alonso took off well to move into first and second by the first corner. The McLarens of Juan Pablo Montoya and Räikkönen were also able to pass Schumacher, moving into 4th and 5th behind Button. Further back in the field, BAR's Takuma Sato made a small mistake, but did not lose a large amount of time. On the second lap, Fisichella was able to widen the gap back to Alonso, while local driver Jacques Villeneuve was forced to pit for a new front wing, leaving him at the back of the field. As the race continued, the Renault's pulled further away from the pack, and Barrichello was constantly moving up the field, up to 15th position by the end of lap 8. Narain Karthikeyan had a spin after a mistake in turn 1, allowing Jordan teammate Tiago Monteiro past.

Michael Schumacher became the first driver to take his scheduled pitstop, refuelling on lap 12 to drop from 6th to 12th position. Three laps later, Button and Ralf Schumacher showed their hands, also entering the pits for more fuel. Button dropped from 3rd to 7th, leaving the two Renaults to lead from the two McLarens. On lap 21, the first of the two-stoppers pitted, with Felipe Massa, Nick Heidfeld and Klien all entering pitlane. The following lap, Sato entered his garage, apparently retiring from the race with gearbox trouble. Lap 24 saw the first of the leaders pit, with championship contenders Alonso and Räikkönen refuelling, before both of their teammates pitted on the following lap. On exiting the pits, Montoya went too fast on cold tyres, leaving the track and allowing Alonso to retain 2nd position. Karthikeyan hit the wall at the back end of the circuit, forcing him to retire from the race. Mark Webber, up to 7th position through a very long first stint, pitted on lap 28, and fed back into the race 9th, just ahead of Massa, Heidfeld and Ralf Schumacher. On the following lap, Webber went wide onto the grass, and in attempting to make up time, braked too late into the hairpin, running very wide and losing 3 positions. Barrichello became the final driver to pit on lap 31, dropping from 8th to 12th.

After following close behind for several laps, and appearing to be quicker, Alonso passed teammate Fisichella for the lead on lap 33, but Fisichella obviously had a technical problem, as Montoya easily passed him on the same lap. Fisichella entered the pits to retire at the end of the lap, with hydraulic system problems. On lap 34, both Button and Michael Schumacher took their second stops, retaining 4th and 5th positions. On lap 35, Alonso led from Montoya, Räikkönen, Button, Schumacher and Jarno Trulli. However, on lap 39, Alonso ran wide at the exit of turn 4 and hit the outside wall, damaging his suspension and forcing him to retire from the race. This left Montoya in the lead, followed by Räikkönen. After following Massa for several laps, Heidfeld's BMW engine failed, allowing Ralf Schumacher into 7th and Webber to 8th. Takuma Sato rejoined the race 24 laps behind, after the B.A.R team fixed his car in order to gain him a slightly better starting position in qualifying for the following grand prix.

On lap 49, the gap from Montoya to Räikkönen was reduced to around 3 seconds. Button, under pressure from Michael Schumacher, made a mistake at the final chicane, hitting the inside kerb heavily, which forced him into the "wall of champions" on the outside. Button was forced to retire from the race, handing 3rd position to Schumacher, and causing the deployment of the safety car as Button's car was in a dangerous position. Every car took the opportunity to pit besides Montoya, who was forced to stay out an extra lap while Räikkönen was refuelled. On exiting the pits, Montoya re-entered the race under the safety car, which had just led the train of cars through turns 1 and 2. Montoya slipped into 2nd, slightly ahead of David Coulthard on track, although the Red Bull Racing driver had been lapped. Before the restart, Räikkönen led from Montoya, Michael Schumacher, Trulli, Webber, Massa, Barrichello and Ralf Schumacher. As the safety car re-entered the pits, Webber made a mistake into turn 1, allowing both Massa and Barrichello through, although the Sauber driver was forced wide and Barrichello moved into 5th. Soon after, it was announced that Montoya was under investigation by the stewards, and he was black-flagged (disqualified) from the race for exiting the pits while a red light was showing (as the safety car was on the pit straight), making it his 2nd consecutive disqualification in Canada.

As the race entered the closing stages, Michael Schumacher closed in on Räikkönen, who was troubled by a misaligned steering wheel. Trulli appeared to be having trouble with his brakes, and retired when they failed, leaving Barrichello in a comfortable 3rd position. However, Barrichello made a small error, allowing Massa to close up behind, but Webber was also close to Massa. Meanwhile, Takuma Sato appeared to have a mechanical failure which forced him to spin at the hairpin, before the rear of his car caught fire due to overheating. Räikkönen was able to retain his 1-second gap back to Schumacher to take the race win, with Barrichello more than 30 seconds behind in 3rd position. Webber was close to Massa into the final corner, but was unable to pass, leaving Massa to take a valuable 4th position and 5 championship points. Completing the pointscorers were Ralf Schumacher, Coulthard and Klien. The result meant Räikkönen reduced the gap in the championship standings to just 22 points, and the double-podium for Ferrari allowed them to close up in the constructors championship.

Classification

Qualifying

Race

Notes:
 — Juan Pablo Montoya was disqualified from the Grand Prix for leaving the pitlane whilst it was closed by means of a red light at pit exit.

Championship standings after the race 

Drivers' Championship standings

Constructors' Championship standings

Note: Only the top five positions are included for both sets of standings.

References

External links

Canadian Grand Prix
Canadian Grand Prix
Grand Prix
2000s in Montreal
2005 in Quebec
Grand Prix